Louis-Casimir Teyssier (1821 in Albi – 1916 at Albi) was a French commander.

Life
He was recruited to the 21st regiment. As a lieutenant, he was wounded in Crimea, near Sevastopol and made a prisoner. He was released in December 15, 1855. made prisoner of war there he returned to France December 15, 1855. Serving in the 98th Regiment of the Line he was again wounded at Montebello, Italy in 1859. Afterwards he commanded a battalion of the 78th regiment of the line and in 1870 he was appointed commander of the fortress of Bitche. During the Franco-Prussian War of 1870-71 he defended the fortress with 3,000 men against about 20,000 Prussian and Bavarian soldiers until the French government ordered him to surrender after the cease fire in 1871. The German troops allowed the French troops to leave Bitche fully armed in acknowledgement of their braveness. He became commander of Marseille in May 1871 and Vicennes in 1872 as colonel.

Decorations and honors
 Commander Légion d'honneur
 Saint Helena Medal
 Medal of Cécile Mulequiès
 British Crimea Medal
 Italian Campaign medal
 Order of Saints Maurice and Lazarus (Sardinia)
 Order of Ernst August awarded 1873 (Hannover) 
 
The city of Albi erected a monument in his honor and named streets after him, while the city of Bitche named a street and its public general high school, Lycée Teyssier, after him.

Further reading
 Léon Belot, Le Colonel Teyssier, défenseur de Bitche, p 143,  Corbière et Julien, 1911
 Eugène Guesquin, Bitche et ses défenseurs (1870-1871), hommage au colonel Teyssier, souvenir à l'Alsace-Lorraine, p. 502 Coulommiers, Impr. de P. Brodard, 1900
 Henri Maynard, Le Colonel Teyssier : héros de Bitche, 1870, p. 4, 1959
 .

People from Albi
1821 births
1916 deaths
French military officers
French people of the Franco-Prussian War
French military personnel of the Crimean War
Commandeurs of the Légion d'honneur